is a private junior college in Shibuya, Tokyo, Japan. It was established as a women's college in 1962, and became coeducational in 2006. In 2009, it set up a distance education program.

See also
 Teikyo University

External links
  

Educational institutions established in 1962
Private universities and colleges in Japan
Japanese junior colleges
Universities and colleges in Tokyo
1962 establishments in Japan